Warner Park Sporting Complex is an athletic facility in Basseterre, St. Kitts, St. Kitts and Nevis.  It includes the Warner Park Stadium, which was one of the hosts for the 2007 Cricket World Cup. It is named after Sir Thomas Warner, the explorer who established the first English colony on St. Kitts.

The eastern segment contains the cricket pitch, pavilion, media centre and seating for 4,000 which can be increased with temporary stands to 10,000 for major events.  The stadium was largely financed by Taiwan with donations totalling $2.74 million.  The total project cost US$12 million, half for the cricket stadium and half for the football facilities.

The western segment contains the football stadium, with seating for 3,500. In the northern section of the park, there are three tennis courts, three netball / volleyball courts, the Len Harris Cricket Academy, and a small open savannah, Carnival City, used primarily for hosting Carnival events.

T20 cricket and the CPL

The West Indies have generally used Warner Park Stadium to host lower ranked international teams in T20 cricket including matches against Afghanistan, Bangladesh and Ireland. While the West Indies remain unbeaten at this venue against those teams they suffered a couple of crushing defeats against the only other international side to have played T20 cricket here, England, being bowled out for 45 and 71 respectively. 

In the CPL, Warner Park plays host to St Kitts and Nevis Patriots but the stadium has also been used for several of the knockout games as well and in 2021 it due to be used as the single venue for all CPL matches

The pitch at Warner Park Stadium has a history of favouring teams that bat second in T20 with a strong preference of sides who win the toss to field first.

List of Five Wicket Hauls

A total of seven five-wicket hauls have been taken at Warner Park, one in a Test match and six in ODIs.

Test matches

One Day Internationals

See also
List of Test cricket grounds

References

External links
Warner Park Cricket Stadium Video and Photos
CricketArchive

Buildings and structures in Basseterre
Sports venues in Saint Kitts and Nevis
Saint Kitts and Nevis
Athletics (track and field) venues in Saint Kitts and Nevis
Cricket grounds in Saint Kitts and Nevis
Football venues in Saint Kitts and Nevis
Test cricket grounds in the West Indies
Sports venues completed in 2006
2006 establishments in North America
2007 Cricket World Cup stadiums